Demirtaş is a village in the Edirne Province of Turkey. The Istanbul-Pythio railway runs through the village and owns the Uzunköprü railway station. The Turkish Grain Board (TMO) maintains a small office in Demirtaş for freight railway shipments.

References

Populated places in Edirne Province